The T-skirt or (Tee-Skirt) is a skirt made of re-purposed or "recycled" t-shirts. They are generally knee or above the knee in length and normally highly patterned with varied designs. The skirt is generally an "A-Line" design which is tight around the hips and widens out in an "A" shape right down the length of the skirt. There are also versions that are tighter in shape which are very similar to the pencil skirt.

Skirts